Stanisław Marcin Chmielewski (born 23 October 1958 in Złotów) is a Polish politician. He graduated law in 1981 at Nicolaus Copernicus University in Toruń. He was elected to Sejm on 25 September 2005, getting 3419 votes in 38 Piła district as a candidate from Civic Platform list.

See also
Members of Polish Sejm 2005-2007

External links
Stanisław Marcin Chmielewski - parliamentary page - includes declarations of interest, voting record, and transcripts of speeches.

1958 births
Living people
People from Złotów
Civic Platform politicians
Members of the Polish Sejm 2005–2007
Members of the Polish Sejm 2007–2011
Members of the Polish Sejm 2011–2015
Nicolaus Copernicus University in Toruń alumni